Lorcan Cranitch (born 28 August 1959) is an Irish actor.

Born in Dublin, Lorcan Cranitch became involved in drama while a student. In 1980 he moved to London, where he trained at RADA.

Career
His first major role on British television was as Tim Healy in the 1991 BBC drama series Parnell and the Englishwoman. It was as the troubled DS Jimmy Beck in Cracker (1993-1995) that he became a familiar face to viewers.

Following Cracker he returned to the BBC in a part specially written for him, as Sean Dillon in Ballykissangel. In 2001 he starred in the short-lived drama series McCready and Daughter, taking on a role originally intended for his former Ballykissangel co-star, Tony Doyle, who died shortly before the series was due to be filmed. He appeared in several other British television dramas, including Deacon Brodie (with Billy Connolly), Shackleton (as Frank Wild) with Kenneth Branagh, Omagh, Hornblower (with Ioan Gruffudd), The Street, Waking the Dead, Spooks, Silent Witness and New Tricks. In 2005 he took a villainous role in the HBO/BBC production of Rome, as the underworld baron Erastes Fulmen. In the 2009 BBC drama Best: His Mother's Son, he played Dickie Best, the father of footballer George Best. He also appeared in The Bill playing DCI Frank Keane.

Lorcan briefly appeared as DI Littlejohn in the Sky Atlantic series Fortitude.

On film he has appeared in Dancing at Lughnasa with Meryl Streep, The Playboys and Titanic Town.

He played Melvin in "New Tricks" "Communal Living" (S5:E7), 2008.  In 2011 he appeared as Liam Cullen in “The Gift of Promise”, (S5:E4) of Lewis.  He appeared in the BBC series Death in Paradise (S5:E7), 2016. In 2017 he played Assistant Chief Constable Nicholls in the first part of the final series of the BBC drama Inspector George Gently, (S8.E1)

He has combined this with stage work with The Royal National Theatre, The Royal Shakespeare Company, Donmar West End, The Abbey and The Gate Theatre in Dublin.

In February 2021, Cranitch took a lead role as Detective Chief Superintendent Jackie Twomey in the BBC crime drama series Bloodlands.

Personal life
Cranitch was married to Susan Jackson, a journalist and newsreader with RTÉ.  They adopted an Ethiopian child in 2010. The couple separated in 2016. His sister, Ellen Cranitch, is a regular presenter on Lyric FM, RTÊ's classical music station.

References

External links

1959 births
Living people
Irish male television actors
Male actors from Dublin (city)
20th-century Irish male actors
21st-century Irish male actors
Alumni of RADA